Frederick Alexander Seymour Sewell (6 October 1881 – 5 June 1964) was an English cricketer.  Sewell was a right-handed batsman who bowled right-arm slow.  He was born at Leamington Spa, Warwickshire.

While studying at St Catharine's College, Cambridge, Sewell made his first-class debut for Cambridge University against AJ Webbe's XI in 1901.  He made four further first-class appearances for the university, the last of which came against Surrey in 1902.  In his five first-class appearances, he scored 69 runs at an average of 11.50, with a high score of 19 not out.  With the ball, he took 6 wickets at a bowling average of 35.50, with best figures of 3/71.  He was however not awarded a Cambridge Blue.

In 1902, Sewell made his debut for Dorset in the Minor Counties Championship against Wiltshire.  He played for Dorset from 1902 to 1913, making 63 Minor Counties Championship appearances.  He later played for Bedfordshire in the Minor Counties Championship in 1921 and 1922, making eight appearances.

He died at Parkstone, Dorset on 5 June 1964.

References

External links
Frederick Sewell at ESPNcricinfo
Frederick Sewell at CricketArchive

1881 births
1964 deaths
Sportspeople from Leamington Spa
Alumni of St Catharine's College, Cambridge
English cricketers
Cambridge University cricketers
Dorset cricketers
Bedfordshire cricketers